Law of small numbers may refer to:

 The Law of Small Numbers, a book by Ladislaus Bortkiewicz
 Poisson distribution, the use of that name for this distribution originated in the book The Law of Small Numbers
 Hasty generalization, a logical fallacy also known as the law of small numbers
 The tendency for an initial segment of data to show some bias that drops out later, one example in number theory being Kummer's conjecture on cubic Gauss sums
 The strong law of small numbers, an observation made by the mathematician Richard K. Guy: "There aren't enough small numbers to meet the many demands made of them."

See also
 Law of large numbers, a theorem that describes results approaching their average probabilities as they increase in sample size. (Hasty generalization is the mistaken application of this law to small data sets.)
 Law of anomalous numbers (also called first-digit law and (Newcomb–)Benford law), an observation about the frequency distribution of leading digits in many real-life sets of numerical data.
 Pigeonhole principle, the occurrence of mathematical coincidences